École publique Renaissance is a French-language public middle school and high school in Timmins, Ontario, Canada, for grades 7 to 12. It consists of two sections, École Publique Pavillon Renaissance, for grades 7&8, and École secondaire publique Renaissance, for grades 9 to 12. It is administered by the Conseil scolaire de district du Nord-Est de l'Ontario, and is open to all students from Timmins and its surrounding area.

See also
List of high schools in Ontario

References

External links
 École Publique Renaissance

French-language high schools in Ontario
High schools in Timmins
Educational institutions in Canada with year of establishment missing